Ahmedabad Cantonment is situated between Ahmedabad city and Gandhinagar in the state of Gujarat in India.

History
The cantonment site was chosen by Sir J. Malcolm in 1830 and established in 1833.

Demographics
 India census, Ahmedabad Cantonment had a population of 14,345.  Ahmedabad Cantonment has an average literacy rate of 81%.

References

Neighbourhoods in Ahmedabad
Indian Army
Cantonments of India
1830 establishments in India